Siramelkudi is a village in the Pattukkottai taluk of Thanjavur district, Tamil Nadu, India. At the 2001 census, its population was 871 with 437 males and 434 females. The sex ratio was 933, and the literacy rate was 61.4%.

References 

 

Villages in Thanjavur district